Václav Vydra (29 April 1876 – 7 April 1953), was a Czech film and stage actor. He starred in 31 films between 1914 and 1953.

Vydra was also a noted stage actor, acting in the Vinohrady Theater and National Theater playing major roles of the characters in plays  by William Shakespeare, Karel Čapek and others). From 1945 to 1949, he was director of the National Theater. In 1946 he became the first actor awarded the National Artist title.

His grandson, Václav Vydra, born 1956, is also a notable actor.

Selected filmography
 Když struny lkají (1930)
 Skeleton on Horseback (1937)
 Lawyer Vera (1937)
 The Merry Wives (1938)
 Enchanted (1942)

External links

1876 births
1953 deaths
20th-century Czech male actors
Czech male film actors
Czech male silent film actors
Czech male stage actors
Burials at Vyšehrad Cemetery